Frank Opperman (1861–1922) was an actor in American silent films. In 1916, he was reported to have had a 29-year career on stage and a 7-year film career.  Between 1903 and 1907, Opperman appeared three times on Broadway, in Little Lord Fauntleroy, Cashel Byron (an adaptation of George Bernard Shaw's Cashel Byron's Profession), and an adaptation of Uncle Tom's Cabin.

In the 1915 short Keystone comedy film A Lucky Leap, Opperman portrays a store owner. Billie Bennett portrays his wife. In the story, their daughter, her love interest, and burglars all take part in a madcap adventure.

Filmography 

Ramona (1910 film) as Ranch hand
As It Is In Life (1910) as Companion of Daughter's Husband
The Unchanging Sea (1910) as In Second Village
The Indian Brothers (1911) as The Indian Chief
An Outcast Among Outcasts (1912) as The Blanket Tramp
The Sands of Dee (1912) as The Fisherman
The Punishment (1912 film) as The Old Gardener
Just Like a Woman (1912 film) as Oil Man
One Is Business, the Other Crime (1912) as The Rich Man's Foreman
Man's Lust for Gold (1912)
Home Folks (1912) as At Barn Dance
A Temporary Truce (1912) as A Drunken Cutthroat / The Indian Chief / The Bartender
The Lesser Evil (1912 film) as In Smuggler Band
A Timely Interception (1913)
The Hero of Little Italy (1913) as In Bar
A Misunderstood Boy (1913) as In Next Town
The Wanderer (1913 film) as The Other Father
Just Gold (1913) as At Farewell / In Town
An Indian's Loyalty (1913) as The Ranchero
The Battle at Elderbush Gulch (1913) as Indian Chief
Red Hicks Defies the World (1913) as In Crowd
The New Superintendent
A Welcome Intruder (1913) as The Hurdy-Gurdy Man
The Little Tease (1913) as On Street / In Lunchroom / A Prospector
Katchem Kate as customer / anarchist
The Goddess of Sagebrush Gulch (1912) as A Cowboy
An Adventure in the Autumn Woods as  First Thief
The Massacre (film) (1912) as Old Settler
The Lady and the Mouse (1913) as Creditor W. C. Robinson as Creditor
During the Round-Up (1913) as The Ranchero
A Feud in the Kentucky Hills (1912) as Second Clan Member
The Yaqui Cur (1913) as The Preacher
Man's Lust for Gold (1912) as The Claim Jumper
Near to Earth (1913) as A Friend
Broken Ways (1913) as Road Agent's Gang Member
The House of Darkness (1913) as A Patient / A Clerk
Judith of Bethulia (1914) as Bethulian
The Old Actor
Those Country Kids (1914) as Mabel's father
Tango Tangles (1914) as Clarinetist / Guest (uncredited)
The Knockout (1914) as Fight Promoter
The Masquerador (1914) as Actor
Gentlemen Of Nerve as Spectator
Fatty's Magic Pants (1914) as Clothing store operator
Tillie's Punctured Romance (1914 film) as Rev. D. Simpson / Guest in first restaurant / Station cop / Movie spectator
Hash House Mashers as Landlord
Colored Villainy (1915) as Rastus, the farmer
A Lucky Leap (1915) as Store owner
Love In Armor (1915) as Sweetheart's father
The Rent Jumpers (1915) as Landlord
Fatty's New Role (1915)
The Little Teacher (1915)  (uncredited)
My Valet (1915) as Hiram Stebbins
A Dash of Courage (1916)

References

External links 
Frank Opperman Page at Lord Heath

1861 births
American male silent film actors
1922 deaths
19th-century American male actors
American male stage actors
20th-century American male actors